Reinwardtiini is a tribe of flies from the family Muscidae.

Genera

Brachygasterina Macquart, 1851
Chaetagenia Malloch, 1928
Correntosia Malloch, 1934
Dalcyella Carvalho, 1989
Itatingamyia Albuquerque, 1979
Muscina Robineau-Desvoidy, 1830
Passeromyia Rodhain & Villeneuve, 1915
Philornis Meinert, 1890
Psilochaeta Stein, 1911
Reinwardtia Brauer & von Bergenstamm, 1890
Synthesiomyia Brauer & von Bergenstamm, 1893

References

Muscidae
Diptera of Europe
Diptera tribes
Taxa named by Friedrich Moritz Brauer
Taxa named by Julius von Bergenstamm